Sheikh Sharhan Naser Tonmoy best known as Sheikh Tonmoy is a Bangladesh Awami League politician and the incumbent member of parliament from Bagerhat-2. He is a grand-nephew of Sheikh Mujibur Rahman and nephew of Sheikh Hasina.

Early life
Tonmoy's father is Sheikh Helal Uddin, Member of Parliament from Bagerhat-1 and cousin of Prime Minister Sheikh Hasina. He completed his higher studies in London, United Kingdom.

Career
Tonmoy was elected to Parliament on 30 December 2018 from Bagerhat-2 as a Bangladesh Awami League candidate.

Sheikh Tonmoy started his career journey with a job at a company in Singapore. Although he was born into a political family and didn't become politically active until 2017, he joined the Bangladesh Awami League as a member from Bagerhat Municipal Branch. That was his formal joining in politics.

References

Awami League politicians
Living people
11th Jatiya Sangsad members
Sheikh Mujibur Rahman family
1987 births
Bangladeshi people of Arab descent